Itek Air, Ltd was an airline based in Bishkek (Manas International Airport) in Kyrgyzstan.

Destinations
As of October 2008, Itek Air operated scheduled passenger flights to the following destinations:

People's Republic of China
Ürümqi (Diwopu International Airport)
Kyrgyzstan
Bishkek (Manas International Airport) Hub
Osh (Osh Airport)
Russia
Moscow (Domodedovo International Airport)
Novosibirsk (Tolmachevo Airport)

The airline is banned from flying within the European Union.

Accidents and incidents

Iran Aseman Airlines Flight 6895

On 24 August 2008, a Boeing 737-200, owned and operated by Itek Air (a Kyrgyz company) on a charter flight for Iran Aseman Airlines, flight 6895, crashed near Manas International Airport in Bishkek, the capital city of Kyrgyzstan, while attempting an emergency landing, returning to the airport of origin, 10 minutes after departure. Sixty-eight people were killed and 22 people survived the crash.

Fleet
The fleet consisted of the following aircraft:

2 Boeing 737-200
The registration of the aircraft were EX-127, EX-311 and EX-009. The last one crashed near Bishkek on 24 August 2008.

References

External links

Itek Air Fleet

Defunct airlines of Kyrgyzstan
Airlines established in 1999
Airlines disestablished in 2010
1999 establishments in Kyrgyzstan